Wortel is a village in the Belgian municipality of Hoogstraten. As of 2021, it has 1,844 inhabitants. 

The toponym means carrot or root in Dutch. Wortel was established in the early 19th century by the Society of Benevolence as a farming colony for the able-bodied working poor. It was meant to provide employment during a time when poverty rates were very high in the Low Countries. Along with the other colonies constructed by the Society of Benevolence, Wortel was inscribed on the UNESCO World Heritage List in 2021 as an excellent example of a unique method of housing reform and urban planning.

Gallery

References

External links 
 
  Official website of Hoogstraten

Sub-municipalities of Hoogstraten
Former municipalities of Antwerp Province
Populated places in Antwerp Province